Ronald Bacon (born November 18, 1946) is an American respiratory therapist who served as a Republican member of the Indiana House of Representatives. He was first elected in 2010. Bacon previously served on the Warrick County Council and as Warwick County coroner.

References

External links
 
Legislative biography of Bacon
Ron Bacon at Vote Smart
Ron Bacon at Poll Vault

Living people
Republican Party members of the Indiana House of Representatives
Place of birth missing (living people)
21st-century American politicians
1946 births